Pandhurna railway station is a railway station in Pandhurna city of Madhya Pradesh. Its code is PAR. It serves Pandhurna city. The station consists of two platforms. Passenger, Express and Superfast trains halt here.

References

Railway stations in Chhindwara district
Nagpur CR railway division